Mark Wing-Davey (born 30 November 1948) is a British actor and director. He portrayed Zaphod Beeblebrox in the radio and television versions of The Hitchhiker's Guide to the Galaxy.

Early life and career
The son of actor and actress Peter Davey and Anna Wing, Wing-Davey attended Woolverstone Hall School in Suffolk before studying English at Gonville and Caius College, Cambridge, where he was a member of the Footlights between 1967 and 1970.

He had a featured role in the 1976 miniseries The Glittering Prizes. This role was later cited by Geoffrey Perkins as the likely reason for his being cast in arguably his most memorable role, that of the two-headed Galactic President, Zaphod Beeblebrox, in the radio and TV versions of The Hitchhiker's Guide to the Galaxy, written by Douglas Adams. He played a barrister in some episodes of the ITV television series Crown Court, King Henry V in Episode 3 of James Burke's Connections, a record company executive in the film Breaking Glass (1980) and an accountant in Absolutely Fabulous.

In the 1983 television production of Alan Bennett's An Englishman Abroad, Wing-Davey played Hamlet in the re-enactment of the Shakespeare Memorial Theatre's 1958 tour to Moscow. His theatre credits include James Stock's Star-Gazy Pie and Sauerkraut (Royal Court Theatre, 1995) and Caryl Churchill's Mad Forest, for which he won an Obie award. He was the first Artistic Director of The Actors Centre, London.

In 2003, he returned to the role of Zaphod Beeblebrox for the Above the Title production of the Hitchhiker's Guide Tertiary to Quintessential Phase radio dramas for BBC Radio 4. More recently he has provided the voice of Judge Ghis in the English version of Final Fantasy XII. Wing-Davey directed the off-Broadway production of Unconditional by Brett C. Leonard at The Public Theater. It was put up by Philip Seymour Hoffman's theater group, LAByrinth Theater Company, of which he is a member. It opened in February 2008.

In May 2008, New York University's Tisch School of the Arts announced that Wing-Davey had been named Chairman of, and arts professor in, the School's Graduate Acting Program. He reprised the role of Zaphod Beeblebrox in 2012 for a live tour of The Hitchhiker's Guide to the Galaxy. Also in 2012, Wing-Davey directed the world premiere of Brett C. Leonard's "Ninth and Joanie" in a LAByrinth Theater Company production. In 2013, he directed William Shakespeare's Pericles, Prince of Tyre at Berkeley Repertory Theatre.

References

External links

Profile at Tisch School of the Arts

1948 births
Living people
English male comedians
English male radio actors
English male stage actors
English male television actors
English expatriates in the United States
Male actors from London
Alumni of Gonville and Caius College, Cambridge
Tisch School of the Arts faculty